Spectrum-X is a Harsh/Industrial music/Gothic/Industrial metal band. Over the years, it has been featured in magazines such as "Dark Spy" from Germany, "Alamode" and Risknote" from Japan, and "Anime Food" and "Gaku-X" in the USA.

Spectrum-X can have many meanings, a notable one being "the ghost without a name."

History 
Founder band members Nullifer and Candy Bones met in 2004, with Nullifer moving to Italy from Chicago, USA in order to create Spectrum-X.

In 2004 they released their demo CD "Dreambook," a self-produced metal mix inspired by Halloween.

In 2005 Spectrum-X began to work on their first full-length album, Tea Party With Zombies(2006), which was self-produced and released in late 2006. This album is still their best selling to date, and was inspired by the theme of Alice in Wonderland, but was twisted into a darker and more Gothic atmosphere.

In early 2006 Spectrum-X also filmed a music video for the song "SLOW" from the album, directed by Pananu Productions, with Candy Bones taking the part of a darker and more gothic Alice.

In 2007 Spectrum-X met Kiwamu, the guitarist of BLOOD and owner for the Japanese Record label Darkest Labyrinth. Darkest Labyrinth provided record distribution for Spectrum-X in Japan, and later a record contract.

They then released their first single, Gnomes Bones (2007), including a music video directed by Mirco Andreas. The song itself is based mostly on a fairy tale theme of thievish gnomes. The video also followed along the lines of a fairy tale but the band itself were depicted as mannequins.

In 2008 Spectrum-X released their second full-length album Darkest Night Ever(2008). This album's theme was a mix of Victorian gothic fairy tales, and a more futuristic second half speaking from the point of view of two otherworldly alien creatures trapped in present day.

Later that year (2008) Spectrum-X was invited to tour in Japan, where they played a few shows in Osaka and Tokyo, and also made a few in store appearances.

Tea Party With Zombies (New Version)(2008) was re-released under the Japanese record label Darkest Labyrinth.

In 2009 Spectrum-X toured in Hollywood at The Knitting Factory.

In June 2010 Spectrum-X returned to tour in Japan to promote the re-release and to help promote the release of Darkest Labyrinth's compilation CD Darkest Labyrinth: Volume 2 (2010).

In early 2011 Spectrum-X decided to remove most of the electric guitar and acoustic instrument from their music to pursue their roots in electro-industrial music.

On October 21, 2011 Spectrum-X released the Album "Black Death," released both under the Japanese record label Darkest Labyrinth and also under the European record label TraumaFactor.

More recently, Spectrum-X worked on a new album with their black metal project (band) which is called Abaddon, which was released in 2017.

Members 
Nullifer: Vocals, Programming, all studio work

Candy Bones: Vocals, Programming

Additional members are brought in for live shows.

Discography

Albums
(some tracks originally composed by Abaddon )
Tea Party With Zombies(2006) 
Darkest Night Ever(2008)  
Tea Party With Zombies (New Version)(2008) 
Black Death(2011)

Singles 
Gnomes Bones (2007) Including Music video

Official Music Videos 
 Slow, album:Tea Party With Zombies(2006) directed by Pananu Productions
 Gnomes Bones, album: Gnomes Bones (2007)  :album:Darkest Night Ever(2008) (2008) Directed by Mirco Andreas

References 

Electro-industrial music groups
American industrial music groups
Italian industrial music groups
Musical groups established in 2004